Yuracyacu (in hispanicized spelling, Yuraq Yaku  in Quechua, yuraq white, yaku water, "white water") is one of nine districts of the province Rioja in Peru.

References